The 14th National Games of China (中华人民共和国第十四届运动会), commonly known as Shaanxi 2021 (陕西2021), was a multi-sports event held throughout Shaanxi from September 15 to 27, 2021 (though some events will be taking place before the games officially start). It is projected that the Games will attract around 20,000 athletes who will compete in 409 events in 35 sports. This will be the first event in the midst of the COVID-19 pandemic.

The 14th National Games will be one of the first major multi-sport events to allow spectators, which have to provide test certificates within 72 hours prior to entering any venues.

Bidding process 
In September 2015, the General Administration of Sport of China officially issued the notice of bid for the 14th National Games. On October 19, the Shaanxi Provincial People's Government formally submitted the bidding materials to the General Administration of Sports. They were left uncontested and thus Shaanxi was confirmed to be the host on January 4, 2016.

Venues 
Many venues as well as public infrastructure were updated in preparation for the Games.

 Xi'an
 Xi'an Olympic Sports Center Stadium (athletics, opening ceremony)  
 Xi'an Olympic Sports Center Gymnasium (closing ceremony)
 Xi'an Olympic Sports Center Swimming and Diving Hall (aquatics)
 Xi'an Qinling International Golf Course (golf)
 Xi'an City Sports Park Gymnasium (basketball-Xi'an division)
 Xi'an City Sports Park Competition Venue (3x3 basketball)
 Outdoor sports rock climbing venue in Yanliang District (rock climbing)
 Outdoor sports skateboarding venue in Yanliang District (skateboarding)
 Xi’an Marathon Venue (marathon)
 Provincial Sports Bureau
 Chang'an Changning Ecological Sports Training and Competition Base (archery)
 Shaanxi Olympic Sports Center Gymnasium (fencing, gymnastics, closing ceremony alternate)
 Shaanxi Provincial Sports Training Center (modern pentathlon) 
 Shaanxi Water Sports Management Center kayaking and rowing) 
 Shaanxi Provincial Stadium (opening ceremony alternate, football-Xi'an division)
 School venues
 Handball Hall of Xi'an Institute of Physical Education (handball)
 Xi’an Institute of Physical Education (hockey, baseball, softball, rugby)
 Xi'an University Gymnasium (badminton)
 Xi’an Middle School Gymnasium (volleyball-Men's Under-20)
 Soaring Gymnasium of Northwestern Polytechnical University (volleyball-women's adult group)   
 Northwest University Chang'an Campus Gymnasium (trampoline, rhythmic gymnastics)
 Xi'an Polytechnic University Lintong Campus Cultural and Sports Center (karate)
 Baoji
 Baoji City Stadium: (football-Baoji Division)
 Baoji Swimming and Diving Hall: (water polo)
 Baoji Vocational and Technical College Football Field: Undertake the 14th National Games football match (Baoji Division) project    
 Xianyang
 Xianyang Olympic Sports Center Stadium (football-Xianyang Division)
 Xianyang Vocational and Technical College Stadium (football-Xianyang Division)
 Xianyang Vocational and Technical College Gymnasium (wushu taolu)
 Tongchuan
 Tongchuan City Gymnasium (basketball-Tongchuan Division)
 Weinan
 Weinan Sports Center Stadium (football-Weinan Division)
 Weinan Sports Center Gymnasium (weightlifting)
 Dali Shayuan Sand Volleyball Venue (beach volleyball)
 Weinan Normal University Gymnasium (Women's Basketball Under-19)
 Weiqing Park Football Field: (football-Weinan Division)
 Yan'an
 Mountain bike venue in Huangling National Forest Park: (mountain bike)        
 Yan'an Sports Center Gymnasium (wrestling)
 Yan'an University Gymnasium (table tennis)
 Yulin
 Yulin Vocational and Technical College Gymnasium (boxing, volleyball-men's adult)
 Hanzhong
 Hanzhong Gymnasium (taekwondo)
 Hanzhong Triathlon Venue (triathlon)
 Ankang
 Ankang Gymnasium (wushu sanda)
 Ankang Yinghu Lake: (marathon swimming)
 Shangluo
 Shangluo Gymnasium (volleyball-Shangluo Division)
 Shangluo Road Cycling Field (road bicycle)
 Hancheng
 Hancheng Jiaotong University Basic Education Park Gymnasium (judo)
 Yangling 
 Yangling Tennis Center (tennis)
 Xixian New District
 Xixian New Area Qin Han New City Equestrian Competition Venue (equestrian)
 BMX venue in Xixian New District (BMX)
 Wanning
 Surfing venue at Sun and Moon Bay (surfing)
 Nanjing
 Breaking venue at Lishui District (breaking)

The Games

Sports 
The program will be nearly identical to that of the 2020 Summer Olympics since the events will occur in close proximity to each other. Breaking and Wushu are the only sport that will be added to the program.

 Aquatics
 
 
 
 
 
 
 
 
 Baseball
 
 
 
 Basketball (2)
 3×3 basketball (2)
 
 
 
 Slalom (4)
 Sprint (12)
 
 BMX freestyle (2)
 BMX racing (2)
 Mountain biking (2)
 Road cycling (4)
 Track cycling (12)
 
 Dressage (2)
 Eventing (2)
 Jumping (2)
 
 
 
 
 
 Artistic (14)
 Rhythmic (2)
 Trampoline (2)
 
 
 
 Kata (2)
 Kumite (6)
 
 
 
 
 
 
 
 
 
 
 
 
 
 
 Volleyball (2)
 Beach volleyball (2)
 
 
 Freestyle (12)
 Greco-Roman (6)

Taolu 
Sanda

Medal record 
Olympic gold medalist swimmer Wang Shun from the Zhejiang province won a total of 6 gold medals in this games, bringing his total National Games gold medals tally to 15, surpassing the previous record of 12 gold medals won by Sun Yang.

References

External links 

 Official website  (in Chinese)

National Games of China
2021 in multi-sport events
2021 in Chinese sport
September 2021 sports events in China
Sport in Shaanxi
Multi-sport events in China